This is a list of episodes of the British television sitcom, Two Pints of Lager and a Packet of Crisps, a BBC series written by Susan Nickson that ran for 9 series from February 2001 to May 2011. It is set in Runcorn, Cheshire and is about the lives and relationships of five twentysomethings.

Overview

Episodes

Series 1 (2001)

Series 2 (2002)

Series 3 (2003)

Musical Special (2003)

Series 4 (2004)

Series 5 (2005)

Series 6 (2006)

Series 7 (2008)

Comic Relief Special (2009)

Series 8 (2009)

The Aftermath (2009)

Series 9 (2011)

It was announced by the BBC in 2011 that a ninth series of Two Pints would be filmed in 2011 and shown later in the year with two new characters called Cassie and Billy. A plot summary of the new "refreshed" series was issued by the BBC. This was the final ever series due to BBC Three axeing the show in July.

References and notes

BBC-related lists
Lists of British sitcom episodes